Vasvaas is a four-part Maldivian horror children's short film series produced by Yoosuf Shafeeu, Hussain Nooradeen and Hassan Adam under Eupe Productions. The first installment of the series, written and directed by Yoosuf Shafeeu was released in 2006 and continued as the writer and director for other installments too. The second installment, begins fifty years later from the events of the first part and the story was continued for further two installments. Filming for the second to fourth installment was completed in Kelaa. Several actors, including Fathimath Fareela and Shaahid filmed for significant roles for the film though the series was discontinued after the fourth installment.

List of productions

Premise

Vasvaas 1
On his birthday, Ali (Abdulla Muaz) gets a gift from his wife, Suzy (Shiuna), that all her wealth and prosperity belongs to him on the condition that she remains as his only wife, while he has a private affair with another woman, Laila (Thuhufaa). Meanwhile, an evil master (Yoosuf Shafeeu) along with his puppet, Kudafoolhu (Hussain Munawwar) makes it his life mission to implant evil suggestions on locals to put themselves in the wrong, while the saint man, Sheikhul Hayya (Ahmed Ziya) attempts to avert his mission. In a cat and mouse game, Suzy dies at the hand of the Master and Ali rejoices her demise as he now owns all her wealth. After Ali and Laila's wedding, the latter encounters several horror incidents which is known to be the action of the Master as he starts having feelings towards Laila. The Master, ultimately reveals that he is to avenge Ali for peeing on him on a fourteenth lunar night and the Master along with Kuafoolhu and Suzy torture Ali to death. The final battle between Sheikh and the Master ends as the latter gets buried underground.

Vasvaas 2
Fifty years later to the events of Vasvaas 1, a group of friends who left in a boat on a stormy night, get stranded on an uninhabited island the next morning. The friends start experiencing strange incidents in their journey from witnessing immortal objects talking, dead end paths to strange appearing creatures. Slowly they start disappearing one by one, while the leader of the group, Faiz (Ali Riyaz) along with another member, Munawwar, unintentionally help Kudafoolhu (Yoosuf Shafeeu) to wake up from his eternal-sleeping curse.

Vasvaas 3
Later that night, they encounter with Kudafoolhu, who expresses his gratitude for lifting the spell unto him by his new evil Master, and in return offers to help them. Kudafoolhu insists to break into the residency mansion of the evil creatures and help Sheikhul Hayya escape, whom he guarantees can help the stranded humans. The group along with Kudafoolhu discuss a masterplan while the creatures desperately hunt for them.

Vasvaas 4
Sheikhul Hayya is held captive for further interrogation, while the humans travel closer to the mansion with hurdles and unforeseen barriers. Faiz is discovered to possess unexplained powers after drinking the yolk of a destructive egg. On their way, they meet other humans who have been held captive in the island for over an year.

Cast 
Vasvaas 1
 Abdulla Muaz as Ali
 Ahmed Ziya as Sheikhul Hayya
 Hussain Munawwar as Kudafoolhu
 Yoosuf Shafeeu as Master
 Shiuna as Suzy
 Thuhufaa as Laila

''Vasvaas 2 Yoosuf Shafeeu as Kudafoolhu (special appearance)
 Ali Riyaz as Faiz
 Mariyam Shahuza as Raihana
 Naashidha Mohamed as Reysham
 Hamdha as Fiyaza
 Saajidh as Faisal
 Aishath Rasheedha as Kamana
 Saalim as Zakariyya
 Solah Mohamed as Munawwar
 Ahmed Ali as Baburu Boa
 Qadhir as Baburu CheeVasvaas 3 Yoosuf Shafeeu as Kudafoolhu
 Ali Riyaz as Faiz
 Ahmed Ziya as Sheikhul Hayya
 Mariyam Shahuza as Raihana
 Naashidha Mohamed as Reysham
 Hamdha as Fiyaza
 Aishath Rasheedha as Kamana
 Solah Mohamed as Munawwar
 Ahmed Ali as Baburu Boa
 Qadhir as Baburu Chee
 Mohamed as Barra BoaVasvaas'' 4
 Yoosuf Shafeeu as Kudafoolhu
 Ali Riyaz as Faiz
 Ahmed Ziya as Sheikhul Hayya
 Mariyam Shahuza  Raihana
 Naashidha Mohamed as Reysham
 Hamdha as Fiyaza
 Saajidh as Faisal
 Aishath Rasheedha as Kamana
 Solah Mohamed as Munawwar
 Ahmed Ali as Baburu Boa
 Qadhir as Baburu Chee
 Mohamed as Barra Boa
 Azhar as Faaraveriya
 Fisaan as Thui Thunbu
 Mohamed Ali

Other credited roles filmed for further installments
 Fathimath Fareela as Malaka
 Saalim as Zakariyya
 Shaahid as Ayya Boodey
 Ibrahim as Anwar
 Shaanee as Shaanee
 Abdulla as Assad

Soundtrack

Accolades

References

Short film series
Maldivian short films
Films directed by Yoosuf Shafeeu